Coppell High School is a  public high school located in Coppell, Texas. It is part of the Coppell Independent School District located in extreme northwest Dallas County. In 2015, the school was rated "Met Standard" by the Texas Education Agency.

Overview
The school graduated its first class of twenty-five students in 1965.  As of the 2017-2018 school year, enrollment was 3,505 students in grades 9-12, however that number decreased in 2018-2019, as the school split the 9th grade to CHS9. There are over 200 staff members at Coppell High School to accommodate the student body of over 2500. Athletic teams are known as the "Cowboys" or "Cowgirls" for boys' and girls' teams, respectively. The school colors are red and black. The school slogan is #CHSRise. The principal is Laura Springer.

Coppell High School was named a 2001-02 National Blue Ribbon School of Excellence due to the new SAS class. Coppell High School has been ranked consistently as one of the "Top 1200 U.S. High Schools."

Demographics 
As of the 20172018 school year, the student population is made up of the following ethnicities out of 3,505 students.

As of the 2018-2019 school year, its student population is made up of the following grade levels: Sophomore (10), Junior (11), Senior (12)

Recent news 

The school's population has grown steadily in the past decade, prompting the Texas University Interscholastic League to upgrade Coppell High School from the 4A classification to 5A status for academic and athletic competition, and then again to 6A; they are currently placed in District 6-6A.

Coppell High School also changed their school schedule system starting in the 2017-2018 school year from a 7 period schedule to an 8 period modified block schedule. The exact schedule has changed year to year, but a modified block schedule employing 2 types of days with 4 classes per day on alternating  "A" and "B" days is currently in place.

In 2006, Coppell High School underwent a strategic plan to unify students, staff members and the community within the large 5A school. As the strategic planning process continued in 2007, the decision was made at that point to implement thematic small learning communities, the career academies. More specifically, it allowed the students who signed up for it to attend academy specific classes that only academy students would be in and to have an elective period occupied by the chosen academy. The choices that were/are available are under the categories of the STEM (Science, Technology, Engineering, Math) Academy, the EMAC (Emerging Media and Communications) Academy, and the PSA (Public Services Academy) Academy. Freshmen and Sophomores of the 2010 class were the first students to be able to join the Academies.

As of May 2015, Coppell High School was ranked 50th in the state of Texas, and 395th nationally by US News.

Academic achievements

Coppell Solar 
The Coppell Solar Racing Team is a group of students from the Coppell School of Engineering that has designed, built, and raced solar cars in the national high school solar car competition since 2008. The team finished 2nd in both the 2018 cross-country race and 2019 Electric-Solar Division race at Texas Motor Speedway.

Speech and debate 
The debate squad travels nationally every year. The team has members who participate in public forum and policy debate, including the Lincoln-Douglas debate. During the 2007-2008, 2009-2010, and 2010-2011 school years, the debate squad qualified a policy team for the Tournament of Champions (debate). During the 2011-2012 school year, one of the school's teams placed second at the 5A UIL State tournament, and the school often has students make it to elimination rounds of the TFA State tournament. In 2014, the debate squad had its top team place 7th at the National Speech and Debate Tournament for policy debate as well as qualify for the Tournament of Champions (debate). In 2019, the policy debate squad's top team placed first at the TFA State tournament and made it to elimination rounds of the 2019 Tournament of Champions (debate).

Health Occupations Students of America 
The Coppell HOSA Chapter was nationally recognized as an Outstanding HOSA Chapter for the 2013–2014 school year.

The Coppell HOSA Public Service Announcement team placed first in the State Leadership Conference in Dallas, Texas (2014-2015). The team attended the NLC (National Leadership Conference) in Anaheim, California in June 2015.

School newspaper, The Sidekick
The Sidekick newspaper at CHS is a student-led journalistic platform known for its stories, photos, videos, podcasts and graphics/page design. The Sidekick'''s purpose is to inform, entertain and provide an educational resource for its readers. This newspaper is a public forum for student expression, with staff members (with assistance from their adviser) making content decisions. The Sidekick is a member of Interscholastic League Press Conference (ILPC), National Scholastic Press Association (NSPA), Southern Interscholastic Press Association (SIPA), Quill and Scroll International Honor Society and Columbia Scholastic Press Association (CSPA). For the 2019-20 school year, the program was nationally recognized as an NSPA Pacemaker, CSPA Crown and Dallas Morning News Best Website award winner, in addition to receiving ILPC Gold and Bronze Stars and numerous NSPA Best of Show Awards.

Student television programKCBY-TV'', the school's weekly media program, was nationally recognized as a Broadcast Pacemaker award winner in 2015 and 2017 by the National Scholastic Press Association. KCBY also received four Lone Star EMMY awards in November 2019 for their accomplishments in KCBY-TV and KCBY-Español.

Athletics
The Coppell Cowboys and Cowgirls compete in the University Interscholastic League (UIL) as 6A teams in the following sports: 12,000-capacity Buddy Echols Field is the main high school stadium.

Baseball
Basketball
Cross country
Football
Golf
Hockey
Lacrosse
Powerlifting
Soccer
Softball
Swimming and diving
Tennis
Track and field
Ultimate Frisbee
Volleyball
Wrestling

Hockey

Hockey is not  UIl sponsored sport in Texas. It is run by the Texas Amateur Hockey Association thru local geographic leagues utilizing USA hockey rules. There are two statewide divisions. One for teams where all players attend the same school (Div 1) and one for players that attend different schools (Div 2) sometimes within the same district but also includes players that are homeschooled or attend districts without teams.

In 2008, 2012, 2013, and 2014 the team won the Summer League Championship.

Lacrosse
Lacrosse is organized by the Texas High School Lacrosse League (THSLL) rather than the UIL. Coppell's lacrosse team has won four state THSLL championships: 2009 and 2010 in Division 2, and 2011 and 2021 in Division 1.

Volleyball
The Coppell Cowgirls volleyball team won back to back state championships in 2011 and 2012.

Soccer
The Coppell Cowboys soccer team won the 5A state championship in 2004 and 2013, and the 6A state championship in 2016. The Coppell Cowgirls soccer team won the 5A state championship in 2009, and the 6A state championship in 2015.

Ultimate frisbee
The Coppell Cowboys Ultimate team won the USA Ultimate High School state championship in 2012 and 2013.

Notable alumni
Peyton Ernst, gymnast
Laura Gao, Chinese-American comics author & artist
Cole Green, professional baseball player
Marcelinho Huertas, professional basketball player
Corey Kluber, professional baseball player 2x AL Cy Young Award winner 2017 and 2014, 3x All Star
Chloe Lanier, actress 
Jeff Lewis, singer-songwriter
Sharon Mathai, singer
Cam McDaniel, former college football player for the Notre Dame Fighting Irish
Emmanuel Moody, professional football player
Erik Nieder, Christian musician
Dan Raudabaugh, professional football player
Jad Saxton, voice actress
Jason Stokes, professional baseball player
Solomon Thomas, professional football player
Chioma Ubogagu, professional soccer player
Chiaka Ogbogu, professional women's volleyball player, USA Women's Gold Medal Team member, Tokyo Olympics 2020
Connor Williams, professional football player

References

External links 
 Coppell High School website
 Coppell Independent School District website

Educational institutions established in 1965
Public high schools in Dallas County, Texas
Coppell, Texas
1965 establishments in Texas
International Baccalaureate schools in Texas